Necydalis is a genus of beetles in the family Cerambycidae: that appears to be mostly distributed in the Oriental and Palaearctic realms.

Species
BioLib includes:
subgenus Calonecydalis Takakuwa, 1992
 Necydalis itoi Takakuwa, 1992
 Necydalis malayana Hayashi, 1979
subgenus Eonecydalis Ohbayashi, 1961
 Necydalis bicolor Pu, 1992
 Necydalis formosana Kano, 1933
subgenus Necydalis Linnaeus, 1758

 Necydalis acutipennis Van Dyke, 1923
 Necydalis alpinicola Niisato & Ohbayashi N., 2003
 Necydalis annectans Holzschuh, 2009
 Necydalis araii Niisato, 1998
 Necydalis atricornis Niisato & Ohbayashi N., 2004
 Necydalis barbarae Rivers, 1890
 Necydalis cavipennis LeConte, 1873
 Necydalis choui Niisato, 2004
 Necydalis christinae Rapuzzi & Sama, 2014
 Necydalis collaris Forster, 1771
 Necydalis diversicollis Schaeffer, 1932
 Necydalis esakii Miwa & Mitono, 1937
 Necydalis fujianensis Niisato & Pu, 1998
 Necydalis gigantea Kano, 1933
 Necydalis hirayamai Ohbayashi, 1948
 Necydalis ignotus Holzschuh, 2009
 Necydalis indica Pic, 1912
 Necydalis inermis Pu, 1992
 Necydalis insulicola Fisher, 1936
 Necydalis katsuraorum Niisato, 1998
 Necydalis kumei Takakuwa, 1997
 Necydalis laevicollis LeConte, 1869
 Necydalis maculipennis Pu, 1992
 Necydalis major Linnaeus, 1758 - type species
 Necydalis marginipennis Gressitt, 1948
 Necydalis mellita (Say, 1835)
 Necydalis mizunumai Kusama, 1974
 Necydalis montipanus Niisato & N. Ohbayashi, 2004
 Necydalis moriyai Kusama, 1970
 Necydalis nanshanensis Kusama, 1975
 Necydalis niisatoi Holzschuh, 2003
 Necydalis rudei Linsley & Chemsak, 1972
 Necydalis rufiabdominis Chen,
 Necydalis sabatinellii Sama, 1994
 Necydalis sericella Ganglbauer, 1889
 Necydalis shinborii Takakuwa & Niisato, 1996
 Necydalis sirexoides Reitter, 1902
 Necydalis spissicus Holzschuh, 2009
 Necydalis strnadi Holzschuh, 1989
 Necydalis uenoi Niisato, 2004
 Necydalis ulmi Chevrolat, 1838
 Necydalis wakaharai Niisato & N. Ohbayashi, 2004
 Necydalis yakushimensis Kusama, 1975

subgenus Necydalisca Plavilstshikov, 1936
 Necydalis concolor Niisato & Ohbayashi, 2004
 Necydalis harmandi Pic, 1902
 Necydalis indicola Gardner, 1941
 Necydalis kukerai Niisato, 2007
 Necydalis lateralis Pic, 1939
 Necydalis nepalens Niisato & Weigel, 2006
 Necydalis odai Hayashi, 1951
 Necydalis pennata Lewis, 1879
 Necydalis sachalinensis Matsushita & Tamanuki, 1927
 Necydalis solida Bates, 1884
 †Necydalis zangi Vitali, 2011

References

Necydalinae
Cerambycidae genera
Beetles of Asia
Beetles of Europe